Flow FM is an Adult contemporary-formatted radio station based in Kapunda, South Australia, and broadcasting to regional and remote communities of South Australia, Victoria and the Northern Territory. It began broadcasting as Radio Freshstream in 2001.

Programming
 The Breaky Flow with Han and Damo
 Mornings with Wayne 'the Flowman' Phillips
 Afternoons with Lisa Jay
 Friday Night Footy Show with Wayne 'the Flowman' Phillips
 The Alan Jones Show (on relay from 2GB Sydney)
 Jonesy & Amanda's Afternoon Delight (on relay from WSFM Sydney)
 Take 40 Australia
 My Generation
 Ben Sorensen's REAL Country

Frequencies

Victoria
 97.9 FM Marengo (Apollo Bay)
 90.9 FM  Otway Ranges (Beech Forest)
 106.3 FM Healesville
 106.5 FM Donald Birchip
 95.3 FM Hopetoun, Ouyen, Mallee Region

South Australia
 100.3 FM Bordertown
 106.1 FM Ceduna
 106.9 FM Central Eyre Peninsula
 99.7 FM Coober Pedy
 97.7 FM Coorong
 107.3 FM Kingston SE, Robe
 90.9 FM Maitland
 96.5 FM Pinnaroo, Lameroo
 97.9 FM Roxby Downs
 99.3 FM Streaky Bay
 101.7 FM Woomera
 97.7 FM Leigh Creek
107.5 FM Burra

New South Wales
 88.7 FM Urana

Northern Territory
 101.5 FM Jabiru
 100.5 FM Tennant Creek

References

External links

Adult contemporary radio stations in Australia
Radio stations in South Australia
Radio stations in Victoria
Radio stations in the Northern Territory